Camp Hemshekh ("continuation" Literally: Camp "Continuation") was a Jewish summer camp in the United States that was founded in 1959 by Holocaust survivors who were active in the Jewish Labour Bund, a Jewish, socialist workers' party in Eastern Europe. The camp was sponsored by the Bund as well. Camp Hemshekh had as its goal instilling in its campers the ideals of the Jewish socialist movement that flourished in interwar Poland: socialism, secular Yiddish culture, equality and justice, and the Bundist concept of doikayt, "hereness," that Jews should live, build their culture and struggle for their rights wherever they dwell, rather than seeking refuge in a Jewish homeland. A Hemshekh camper is called a Hemshekhist (the plural is Hemshekhistn).

Campsites 
Camp Hemshekh was located at five campsites:

Ghetto Night 
One of the more memorable events each summer was "Ghetto Night". Ghetto Night took place on the third Sunday of August. Ghetto Night was a solemn, all-day commemoration of the Jewish partisans and victims of the Nazis that culminated in a gripping English and Yiddish retelling of the Holocaust through poetry and song. At the end of the performance, as the piano softly played the haunting melody of Ani Ma'amin (reportedly sung by Jews during the Holocaust as they entered the gas chambers), the camp walked out single file, and followed a torch-lit path to the "Ghetto Denkmol".
One of the Ghetto Night programs, titled "Varshever Oyfshtand un Geto Akademie" ("Warsaw Uprising and Ghetto Program"), was as close the camp came to a religious service in the adamantly secular Camp Hemshekh. It began with a bellowed command: "Z’khor! Gedenk vos es hot geton mit dayn folk der daytshisher nazi amalek" — "Remember! Remember what the German Nazi Amalek did to your people." It closed with a pledge that they chanted in unison: "To remember and remember and remember for all time." This was followed by a call and response: "Let there be no forgetfulness! No forgetfulness! Let there be no dimming of memory! No dimming of memory! Let the memory be clear as glass, cold as ice and bright as a diamond."
This Ghetto Night Program included the heartrending, untitled poem that concluded: "The hands of the killers/Broke the locked hold/Of our mother's mad embrace/It was all in vain/The frantic cries/The murderer-hands clawed our flesh/Hurled us against the wall/To instant death." It included the gruesome, like Yuri Suhl's "The Permanent Delegate": "I am the spasm of a body convulsed in flames, the crumbling of a skeleton, the boiling of blood," and the macabre, such as Aaron Zeitlin's "Kinder fun Majdanek" ("Children of Majdanek"): "Kopele, where is your head? Where is the light of your eyes?"
At its heart, however, the program was a tribute to Jewish Resistance. Much of the text was taken from Never to Forget: the Battle of the Warsaw Ghetto, written by Howard Fast and William Gropper, published in 1946 by the Jewish People's Fraternal Order, International Workers Order There were also up-tempo, bold songs like Shmerke Kaczergin-ski's Yid Du Partizaner — "Fun di getos tfise vent/in di velder fraye/anshtot keytn oyf di hent/kh’alt a biks a naye!" ("From the ghetto's prison walls/into the free forests/Instead of chains on my hands/I carry a new rifle!")

Music
Singing was an integral part of the camp. At breakfast, in the dimly lit dining room, campers belted out popular Yiddish and English camp tunes to the accompaniment of an aging piano; during rest hour, selected campers would rehearse the Yiddish musical numbers for the "Visiting Day" plays, the midsummer Holocaust commemoration or some other cultural event; and a favorite pastime for campers and counselors alike was sitting with friends under the Milkh Boym (Milk Tree), strumming the guitar, and trying to remember all the lyrics to Bob Dylan and Phil Ochs hits.

"Ghetto Denkmol" 
There were two version of the "Ghetto Denkmol". The first "Ghetto Denkmol" was a small, white wooden booth and had a mosaic of a Ghetto fighter built in 1962 by the now world-famous architect, Daniel Libeskind. The second version was a simple memorial that consisted of a replica of the barbed-wire, glass-encrusted ghetto wall, and six black signposts of  representing the 6 million Jews murdered, each one inscribed, in Yiddish, with the name of a death camp. In the center stood a striking mosaic of the same ghetto fighter built by Daniel Libeskind. His mosaic partisan was a young man dressed in military-style garb, triumphantly stepping out of flames, one arm thrusting a rifle, the other with fist clenched. The face was an oval devoid of features.

On "Ghetto Day", a boy and girl from the group of oldest campers stood vakh (Yiddish for watch or vigil) at the Denkmol throughout the day. Dressed in work-shirts and red bandanas, they were silent and solemn, changing shifts every hour so that the wall was never unguarded, and so all the oldest campers had the chance to perform this honor.

Memory as an element in the Camp 
Memory was embedded everywhere, beginning with the camp's name: Hemshekh means "continuation" in Yiddish. A banner above the stage in the hall where we performed plays and had socials implored, "Lomir Trogn Dem Gayst Vos Men Hot Undz Fartroyt" — "Let us carry the spirit that has been entrusted to us." A small rock garden where we held campfires and meetings was named in honor of Froim Lozer, a Bundist who had fought for a small park to be built in the crowded, dirty industrial city of Łódź for workers to enjoy a bit of air after long hours in the textile factories. Even nature was pressed into the service of memory: Small wooden plaques nailed to trees bore the names Henryk Ehrlich and Viktor Alter, Bundist activists and resistance organizers murdered by Joseph Stalin's police, and Mordechai Anielewicz, the 23-year-old commander of the Warsaw Ghetto Uprising.

Notable campers
 Daniel Libeskind
 Nina Libeskind (née Lewis)
 Binyumen Schaechter
 Zalmen Mlotek
 Gitl Schaechter-Viswanath
 Lazer Lederhendler
 Gloria Brame
 John Loike

Reunions

1987 reunion 
On Sunday, November 15, 1987, a Camp Hemshekh reunion was held on the Windows on the World restaurant, at the World Trade Center. About 200 campers, from all over the world came.

1999 reunion 
There was a reunion on October 10, 1999 which was held at the Terrace On The Park party venue located in Flushing Meadows Park.  Almost 400 former campers, counselors and others affiliated with the Camp were contacted/invited. (The existence of the "new" internet proved a great help in tracking people down.) Approximately 200 former "Hemshekhists" attended while an additional 40+ spouses and children joined in the festivities.

At the reunion all attendees receive a booklet that was a combination Songbook and Address List.  The songbook included 104 songs—three-quarters of which were in Yiddish (always provided in Yiddish orthography as well as in transliteration) -- which were well known throughout the 20-year existence of the Camp.

50th Anniversary (2009) reunion 
On October 10 through October 12, 2009 (Columbus Day Weekend), Camp Hemshekh had its 50th Anniversary Reunion in New York City. The main event took place on Sunday, October 11, 2009, at the Workmen's Circle Building. It began at noon, and continued through the night.

Saturday's activities consisted of informal house pot-luck gatherings at the homes of Hemshekhistn from the different generations of camp, who live in or near New York City. No less than nine campers visited the old campsites at the Hunter and Mountaindale campsites. Photos of the remnants of the campsites were posted on the walls at the main event, along with photos of the camp, and campers from the different years. At least five hundred photos were taken during the various parts reunion. Extensive, yet rough video footage was taken at the main event. Using that footage, previous films and the many photographs of Camp Hemshekh, a basic film is planned to be created. The majority of uploaded photos and videos of this reunion, previous ones, and of Hemshekh in general, can be found on the Camp Hemshekh Facebook group, here, and here. This reunion was mainly organized by the Reunion Komitet (Reunion Committee), including George Rothe, Sabina Brukner, Michael "Toes" Rosenberg and Lisa Geduldig. About 200 campers came to the main event.

See also 
 General Jewish Labour Bund
 S.K.I.F.
 Tsukunft   
 The Workmen's Circle   
 Jewish Left

References

External links 
 The Camp Hemshekh 2009 Reunion website
 The Camp Hemshekh Facebook group
 The Camp Hemshekh 50th Anniversary Reunion Facebook event
 
 Teddy Crane's (Camp Hemshekh camper) Photo Archive
 Downloadable Various Camp Hemshekh Material by Sabina Brukner, Includes "1965 Olympics Fakeout" (PDF), "1975 Ghetto Night Script" (PDF), "1976 Ghetto Night Script" (PDF), 1975 "Counselor Play: Di Tsvey Kuni Leml" (mp3 26mb), "1999 Reunion Newsletter" (PDF), "1999 Reunion Songbook" (PDF), "1999 Reunion Songbook"-P.21 (PDF)
 An old Camp Hemshekh website (defunct) by David Reed
 

Bundism in North America
Jewish-American history
Jewish anti-Zionism in the United States
Jewish socialism
Hemshekh
Secular Jewish culture in the United States
Socialism in the United States
Jews and Judaism in Sullivan County, New York
Greene County, New York
Ulster County, New York
Yiddish culture in New York (state)
1959 establishments in New York (state)
1978 disestablishments in New York (state)